Daniel Campbell Gordon (July 13, 1902 – August 13, 1970) was an American storyboard artist and film director, best known for his work at Famous Studios and Hanna-Barbera Productions. Gordon was one of Famous' first directors. He wrote and directed several Popeye the Sailor and Superman cartoons. Later, at Hanna-Barbera, Gordon worked on several cartoons featuring Yogi Bear, Huckleberry Hound, and others. His younger brother, George Gordon, also worked for Hanna-Barbera.

Gordon also wrote and illustrated comic books under the pen name "Dang".

Career

Van Beuren Studios, Fleischer Studios and Famous Studios 
Dan Gordon began his animation career as a story man at New York's Van Beuren Studios, and by 1936, he was receiving a director's credit there. After Van Beuren closed its animation department in 1936, Gordon and many of his colleagues went to work for Paul Terry’s Terrytoons. It was here that Gordon worked with Joe Barbera (another Van Beuren alumni) on Pink Elephants, a cartoon that Barbera described as one of "... the first cartoons I had a hand in actually creating from the beginning.”

Gordon and Barbera headed out West to MGM in 1937, but Gordon returned back to the East shortly thereafter to help re-write the troubled animated feature film, Gulliver’s Travels at Fleischer Studios. Gordon’s rewrites could not save much of Gulliver, but Gordon was instrumental in the success of the Fleischer Studios’ next hit: the 1941 Superman theatrical animated shorts.

Gordon was one of four directors put in charge of production when Paramount seized control of the Fleischer studio in Miami. While he only stayed at the newly dubbed Famous Studios for a couple of years, the Popeye shorts he directed are notable for their intense comic energy and extended fourth wall-breaking gags. The Hungry Goat, released in 1943, stands out as an attempt to popularize his own creation Billy the Kid, a screwball anthropomorphic goat. This work was heavily influenced by contemporary Warner Bros. shorts. The fast-pace of those Popeye cartoons led into the comic book stories he crafted for The American Comics Group (ACG). Gordon was fired from Famous Studios in late 1943 or early 1944, presumably due to alcohol-related problems.

Comic books

Supercut and cartoon animals 
Gordon was part of a group of animation pros led by Jim Davis (of Fox and the Crow fame) that supplied original talking-animal comic book stories to ACG and DC Comics. Gordon's work began appearing in Giggle Comics in 1944, and by Giggle #9, he introduced the long-running character Superkatt who was a jab at the “long-underwear” genre of superhero comics. The title character does not have any superpowers at all but is a normal (talking) house cat that dresses in a diaper, a baby's bonnet, and a big blue bow to fight minor neighborhood injustices.

In 1949 came Funny Films, a talking-animal anthology title that tried to convince the reader that its stories were the filmed exploits of famous Hollywood cartoon characters.

Gordon's Puss and Boots was a dog-and-cat version of Tom and Jerry to the extreme, with its only theme being unbridled cartoon violence. Gordon's other Funny Films character was the comical rabbit inventor Blunder Bunny. In La Salle Comics' Hi-Jinx, he experimented with the hybrid idea of “teenage animal funnies”.

Cookie O'Toole 
Gordon's final major character from this era is Cookie O’Toole, the teenage star of Cookie comics. Cookie began his run in 1945 when he and his whole gang (best friend/hipster Jotterbook, heartthrob Angelus, sharp-dressed rival Zoot, and their egghead pal, “The Brain”) appeared fully formed in a one-shot issue of Topsy-Turvy Comics. By the next year, Cookie had his own title, and began a run that lasted nine years and 55 issues.

Gordon continued to make comics for ACG (and ACG imprints like La Salle) until he was called back into animation service by his old friend Joseph Barbera.

Hanna-Barbera 
Bill Hanna and Joe Barbera had been creating the classic Tom and Jerry cartoons at MGM since 1940, but by 1957 the studio’s animation division was shut down. In a bid to stay alive in the new TV era, Hanna and Barbera struck out on a mission to make a weekly animated television series for a fraction of their old Tom and Jerry budgets.

Gordon jumped on board to help out at Hanna-Barbera, and (with partner Charles Shows) was soon writing and drawing storyboards for most of the episodes of those earliest, foundational H-B cartoon classics: Huckleberry Hound, Yogi Bear, Pixie & Dixie, Quick Draw McGraw, and Augie Doggie. Emboldened by their early success in Saturday morning, Hanna and Barbera set their sights on producing a prime-time domestic comedy with a prehistoric twist. Gordon had some experience with cartoon cavemen, having worked on the “Stone Age” series of animated shorts for Fleischer Studios back in 1940. Although many talented people had a part in creating what would become The Flintstones, Bill Hanna points to Gordon. “Now you may not get the same response from anybody else, Bill Hanna recalls,” but to me, Dan Gordon is responsible for The Flintstones. He came up with the basic concept of doing it with cavemen in skins.” And Joe Barbera recounts in his autobiography that, ”the first two Flintstones were the work of Dan Gordon and myself; I controlled the content, and Dan did the storyboards.”

Dan Gordon continued to work for Hanna-Barbera until his death in 1970.

Death 
Gordon passed away on August 13, 1970, one month after his 68th birthday. Some sources state his last known location was in Fulton County, Georgia, but the legitimacy of this information is unknown.

His wife, Margaret Hannon, died at the age of 39 in 1946 from brain cancer. Dan and Margaret had three sons. Son, Kevin, died in a house fire in Malibu, in 1965.  Son, Michael, died in 1965 in car accident in Los Angeles.  Son, Donal, died in 1994 from cancer in Seattle. Dan Gordon died of liver disease while in a nursing home in Atlanta, GA in 1970.  Dan had five grandchildren from son Donal and wife, Frances. This information is cited by his granddaughter.

Legacy 
Gordon's cartoons live on through sales of DVD reissues featuring many of his Superman and Popeye cartoons, and deluxe DVD sets of Huckleberry Hound and The Flintstones. Some of his work from the early Van Beuren Studios and Terrytoons days can be found on video streaming sites on the Internet. With the advent of eBay, online comic shops, and cartoon/comics blogs, today, well-worn back issues of Gordon's comics such as Giggle, Ha-Ha, and Cookie are easier to find and can be bought at reasonable costs. Many fans of Gordon's work have been scanning and sharing these public-domain stories online.

Notes and references

External links 

Dan Gordon biography
Dan Gordon's Comics
 Lambiek Comiclopedia article.

1902 births
1970 deaths
American male screenwriters
American animators
American film directors
American animated film directors
American storyboard artists
American comics artists
Place of birth missing
Hanna-Barbera people
Fleischer Studios people
20th-century American male writers
20th-century American screenwriters
Terrytoons people
Famous Studios people